Robert Peck (died c. 1400), of Lincoln and London, was an English politician.

He was a Member (MP) of the Parliament of England for Lincoln in January 1390.

References

14th-century births
1400 deaths
English MPs January 1390
People from Lincoln, England